Fenwick is a village in East Ayrshire, Scotland. In 2019, its population was estimated to be 989. Fenwick is the terminus of the M77 following its extension which was opened in April 2005, at the beginning of the Kilmarnock bypass.

History

The Fenwick Weavers' Society was founded in Fenwick in 1761 and is considered one of the first co-operatives in the world.

Fenwick Parish Church dates back to 1643, with Rev. Colin Strong currently overseeing its leadership.  The Primary School in Fenwick currently feeds to Loudoun Academy in Galston. In summer 2017, the primary school underwent an extension that saw a new gym hall built and the old dinner hall and hut demolished.

The two main areas of Fenwick are High Fenwick and Laigh Fenwick, referring directly to the area of housing and community at the top of Kirkton Road and the area of housing at the bottom. There remains a friendly rivalry between these two areas which culminates with the annual Fenwick gala cricket match where the two sides face off against each other.

John Fulton Hall is in Fenwick, located next door to what used to be the Fenwick Medical Practice (which relocated from the rear of the local newsagents in the 1990s) and WANT Hair Salon. KB Holistic and Alternative Therapies is located on the site of the practice, which closed due to a lack of GPs.

The Post Office (which is located on the Main Street) used to be located next to Waterslap but also moved closer to the main hub of the village in the 1990s. The old location of the Post Office has since been occupied by Fenwick Fine Foods and, recently, Logan's Larder.

The Fenwick Hotel used to be Best Western Hotel but now runs independently.  The Kings Arms pub is located a few houses up from Jessie Gordon's  Store, the longest-running single-owner private establishment in Fenwick from 1975 to 2016. Her husband Willie Gordon (who was Janitor at Fenwick Primary School for 34 years) was also a regular paper boy for the shop up to the grand age of 89.

McFadzean Garage is located next to the former Church of Scotland Nursing Home, Dunselma. Dunselma has been closed and the building demolished and all that remains of it is part of a road leading up to the site. Hall House opposite Fenwick Fine foods delicatessen and coffee shop is a Nursing Home.

Notable people
George Allan was minister and shot several films of the village. 
William Guthrie, minister and author of The Christian's Great Interest
John Paton, Covenanter, army captain, executed in the Grassmarket
Rev James Barr leader of the United Free Church Continuing and politician

References

Sources

External links
 WANT Hair Salon - Facebook
 KB Holistic Therapy - Home|Facebook

Villages in East Ayrshire